Hemilocrinitus barbatus is a species of beetle in the family Cerambycidae, and the only species in the genus Hemilocrinitus. It was described by Galileo and Martins in 2005.

References

Hemilophini
Beetles described in 2005